Parzard or Par-e Zard or Par Zard may refer to:
 Parzard, Khuzestan
 Par Zard, Kohgiluyeh and Boyer-Ahmad